Astata is a cosmopolitan genus of solitary predatory wasps in the subfamily Astatinae. They are known to prey on adults and nymphs of Pentatomidae. Astata is the largest genus in this subfamily, and is identified by features of its wing venation. The males of this genus and the related genus Dryudella have very large compound eyes that broadly meet at the top of the head.

There are 94 species and subspecies of Astata worldwide, a few of which are listed here:
Astata affinis
Astata apostata Mercet, 1910
Astata bicolor
Astata boops (Schrank, 1781)
Astata brevitarsus Puławski, 1958
Astata costae A. Costa, 1867
Astata diversipes Puławski, 1955
Astata gallica de Beaumont, 1942
Astata graeca de Beaumont, 1965
Astata leuthstromi
Astata minor Kohl, 1885
Astata occidentalis
Astata quettae Nurse, 1903
Astata rufipes Mocsáry, 1883
Astata unicolor

References

External links 
 Genus Astata
 Wasp Preys Upon Stink Bug
 Nature Search: Astata

Crabronidae
Apoidea genera
Biological pest control wasps
Cosmopolitan arthropods
Hymenoptera of Asia